Stelios Panagiotou (born 26 October 2001) is a Greek professional footballer who plays as a center-forward for Super League 2 club Apollon Larissa.

References 

2001 births
Living people
Greek footballers
Apollon Larissa F.C. players
Association football forwards
Footballers from Larissa